Oleksandr Bezimov (born 8 February 1984 in Ukrainian SSR) is a Ukrainian football striker who currently plays for FC Zaria Bălți in the Moldovan National Division.

Bezimov played in the different Russian and Moldovan football clubs. In February 2014 he signed a contract with FC Olimpia Bălți.

References

External links

Ukrainian footballers
Association football forwards
1984 births
Living people
Ukrainian expatriate footballers
CSF Bălți players
FC Costuleni players
FC Zimbru Chișinău players
FC Iskra-Stal players
FC Milsami Orhei players
Expatriate footballers in Russia
Expatriate footballers in Moldova
Ukrainian expatriate sportspeople in Russia
Ukrainian expatriate sportspeople in Moldova